Preseli Pembrokeshire is a seat and constituency of the House of Commons of the Parliament of the United Kingdom.

The Preseli Pembrokeshire Senedd constituency was created with the same boundaries in 1999.

Its MP, who has held the seat since 2005, is the Conservative Stephen Crabb, who was Secretary of State for Work and Pensions (Work and Pensions Secretary) from March to July 2016. The seat was held by Labour's candidate from its creation in 1997 until 2005. The Labour and Conservative parties have won at least 27.7% of the vote apiece since its 1997 creation, with the next-placed parties having reached a maximum of 14.5% of the vote to date in a generally broad field.

The seat attracted five candidates in 2010, eight in 2015 (an election in which five of the deposits were refunded and three lost) and seven in 2017. At the 2017 election, Crabb's majority was the 27th closest out of the 650 Commons seats, 0.8% or 314 votes. In 2019, there were four candidates; Crabb retained the seat with an increased majority.

Constituency profile
The seat is predominantly rural with both Welsh and English speaking areas. Milford Haven has a significant port and oil industry, and tourism is also a key sector due to the Pembrokeshire Coast National Park. The seat is less affluent than the UK average.

Boundaries

The constituency was created in 1997 from parts of the seats of Ceredigion and Pembroke North and Pembroke. It comprises the north and west coasts of Pembrokeshire and areas inland, including the Preseli Hills in the north of the county. It is the most westerly constituency in Wales.  Much of the coastal area is in the Pembrokeshire Coast National Park.

On its creation in 1997, its boundaries were co-terminous with the then District of Preseli Pembrokeshire. Since the 2006 boundary review of Welsh parliamentary constituencies, which took effect at the 2010 general election, it consists of the Pembrokeshire County electoral divisions of: Burton; Camrose; Cilgerran; Clydau; Crymych; Dinas Cross; Fishguard North East; Fishguard North West; Goodwick; Haverfordwest Castle; Haverfordwest Garth; Haverfordwest Portfield; Haverfordwest Prendergast; Haverfordwest Priory; Johnston; Letterston; Llangwm; Llanrhian; Maenclochog; Merlin's Bridge; Milford Central; Milford East; Milford Hakin; Milford Hubberston; Milford North; Milford West; Newport; Neyland East; Neyland West; Rudbaxton; St David's; St Dogmaels; St Ishmael's; Scleddau; Solva; The Havens; and Wiston.

Members of Parliament

Elections

Elections in the 1990s

Elections in the 2000s

Elections in the 2010s

 

Of the 153 rejected ballots:
119 were either unmarked or it was uncertain who the vote was for.
34 voted for more than one candidate.

See also
 Preseli Pembrokeshire (Senedd constituency)
 List of parliamentary constituencies in Dyfed
 List of parliamentary constituencies in Wales

Notes

References

External links
Politics Resources (Election results from 1922 onwards)
Electoral Calculus (Election results from 1955 onwards)
2017 Election House Of Commons Library 2017 Election report
A Vision Of Britain Through Time (Constituency elector numbers)

Parliamentary constituencies in South Wales
Districts of Pembrokeshire
Constituencies of the Parliament of the United Kingdom established in 1997